Yuriy Kralov ( (born 18 October 1976) at Odessa Ukraine SSR is a Ukrainian economist and banker, co-owner and chairman of the Board of Public Joint Stock Company MTB BANK.

Education
Yuriy Kralov graduated from Odessa National Polytechnic University with a degree in Production Management in 1998.

Career
He joined the Marine Transport Bank, where he became Head of the Commercial Department on January 8, 1998.

Yuriy Kralov became deputy chairman of the board for Corporate Business on March 28, 2005. The Cypriot Marfin Popular Bank Public Co LTD bought the Marine Transport Bank in 2007 and renamed it into Marfin Bank PJSC in 2010. The Cypriots sold the bank to Ukrainian investors, and the institution was renamed into Public Joint Stock Company MTB BANK  in June 2017. All this time Yuriy Kralov had been deputy chairman of the board. He became chairman of the Board of PJSC MTB BANK on October 23, 2017.

Sponsorship
Yuriy Kralov took part in organization of exhibitions in Odesa of such artists: Polina Zinovieva, Tetyana Popovychenko, Andriy Kovalenko, Petro Nahulyak, Olga Kotova, Volodymyr Dudnyk, Vitaliy Parastyuk.

He initiated providing financial assistance to the Odessa National Academic Opera and Ballet Theater and supported MTB BANK's joining Board of Trustees of the theater.

Under the leadership of Yuri Kralov, MTB BANK sponsored international tennis tournaments, the annual cruising yacht regatta Black Sea Cup and the Black Sea Ports Cup, and the participation of Ukrainian athletes in international motocross competitions.

With the active support of Yuri Kralov MTB BANK became a partner of Veres football team and took part in the first sports IPO on the Ukrainian stock exchange PFTS.

References

Links
 Bankchart: Kralov Yuriy Oleksandrovych
 Yuriy Kralov: MTB BANK is looking to the future with confidence!
 Yuriy Kralov: The condition of the bank's life is the well-being of its customers 

1976 births
21st-century Ukrainian businesspeople
21st-century Ukrainian economists
Businesspeople from Odesa
Chairpersons of corporations
Living people
Odesa National Polytechnic University alumni
Ukrainian bankers